LEM domain-containing protein 3 (LEMD3), also known as MAN1, is an integral protein in the inner nuclear membrane (INM) of the nuclear envelope. It is encoded by the LEMD3 gene and was first identified after it was isolated from the serum of a patient with a collagen vascular disease.

Structure
The protein is 82.3 kDa and has a 40 amino acid long LEM domain located at its amino-terminal region. In its carboxyl end it has a RNA recognition motif (RRM). The LEM domain is also common to two other integral proteins of the INM: lamina-associated polypeptide 2 (LAP2) and emerin.

The LEM segment enables LEMD3 to attach to the barrier-to-autointegration factor (BAF), and therefore, indirectly interact with the chromatin. LEMD3 also has several implications in regulating the cytokine family such as the transforming growth factor beta (TGF-β) and bone morphogenic protein (BMPs). The RRM domain in its carboxylic region attaches to the SMAD (protein) proteins, which is involved in mediating TGF-β cellular signalling. Consequently, LEMD3 indirectly regulates downstream genes.

LEMD3 seems to play an important role in regulating the expression of several fundamental genes.

LEMD3 and disease
LEMD3 has been associated with laminopathies as well as osteopoikilosis. Mutations in the LEMD3 gene have been linked to several genetic diseases such as osteopoikilosis, melorheostosis and Buschke-Ollendorff syndrome.

See also 
Inner nuclear membrane proteins

References

External links